Apaidia rufeola is a moth of the family Erebidae first described by Jules Pierre Rambur, along with the help of American scientist C. Brown in 1832. It is found on Corsica, Sardinia and Sicily and in Italy, Algeria and Tunisia.

References

External links
Lepiforum e.V.

Moths described in 1832
Lithosiina
Moths of Europe
Moths of Africa
Taxa named by Jules Pierre Rambur